The Ethiopian Premier League (Amharic: የኢትዮጵያ ፕሪምየር ሊግ), known as the BetKing Ethiopian Premier League for sponsorship reasons, is the top tier association football league of Ethiopia run by the Ethiopian Premier League Share Company (formerly the Ethiopian Football Federation from 1997 to 2020). Established in 1997 (1990 E.C.), it replaced the former first division (est. 1944). Contested by sixteen clubs, it operates on a system of promotion and relegation with the other secondary and tertiary leagues in Ethiopia. The league has been an annual competition since the 1997–98 season with Saint George S.C. emerging as the country's leading club in this era with 15 titles (30 first division titles overall).

History

Beginnings 
The first officially recognized version of an Ethiopian football league was established in 1944. Originally five teams representing the various communities of Addis Ababa and The British Military Mission in Ethiopia (BMME) contested for the title which was won by the BMME. The Ethiopian Cup was added the following year and has been contested regularly since with the exception of some gap years.

The early years of Ethiopian top division football were dominated for the most part by Mechal (now Defense Force SC). The club won 6 titles throughout the 40s and 50s. St. George SC enjoyed some dominance in the late 60s after which the league went through a period of relative parity in the 70s and 80s. The league went through changes in the 1990s culminating in the founding of the Ethiopian Premier League in 1997 (1990 E.C.) by the Ethiopian Football Federation (EFF) and the teams that made up the top division of Ethiopian Football.

Premier League Era 
The inaugural 1997-98 Ethiopian Premier League Season saw Ethio Electric (known as Mebrat Hail at the time) lift the trophy. The following year the league decided to increase the number of teams to 10, a year that ended with perennial favorites St. George S.C lifting their first Premier League trophy (16th title overall). St. George would go on to repeat as champions the following year (1999-00 season).

The 2000–01 season was a special one in the league thanks in large part to the offensive display of Ethio Electric striker Yordanos Abay. Abay scored what was then a record 24 goals during his league campaign helping Ethio Electric to its second Premier League title (3rd overall title). His record would stand 16 years until being surpassed by Dedebit striker Getaneh Kebede who scored 25 goals during the 2016-17 season. The following season (2001-02 season) Ethio Electric were picked by many to repeat as champions, but fell short of expectation by finishing behind eventual champions St. George.

The 2002–03 season saw the first real contenders from outside the Addis Ababa push for a Premier League title. The title race came down to the last day with St. George needing a win against rivals Ethiopian Coffee to secure their 4th Premier League title (19th overall title). Second place side Arba Minch Textiles, based in southern city of Arba Minch, was looking to win its first title but needed a St. George S.C. lose to do so. In the end however, St. George was able to win their match and retain the title but the strong display by Arba Minch Textiles showed that teams outside the capital were indeed ready to contend in the top league once again.

The 2003–04 season turned out to be breakthrough year for teams outside of Addis Ababa as Hawassa City S.C., led by their captain Kamal Ahmed, were able to lift the Premier League trophy for the first time in their history. The title race once again came down to the last day as Hawassa City had to beat Nyala S.C. to fend off the likes of Ethiopian Coffee S.C. and Trans Ethiopia for the Premier League title. The following two season were once again dominated by St. George S.C. as they were able to lift their 5th and 6th Premier League titles (20th and 21st titles overall).

The start of the 2006–07 season saw the league expand to 16 clubs. The season ended with Hawassa City winning their second title in as many years preventing a St. George S.C. three peat. However, the next three consecutive seasons would be again dominated by St. George, under the guide of their manager Mencho, St. George would add their 7th, 8th and 9th Premier League titles (22nd, 23rd, & 24th titles overall). St. George's biggest rivals, Ethiopian Coffee, would put a stop to their tremendous run by winning the 2010-11 title, their first Premier League title (second title overall). However, St. George would come back the next season and win the title once again in 2011-12. St. George's attempt at a repeat would be thwarted though as the next season Dedebit F.C. would instead be crown champions for the first time in their history.

Starting from the 2013-14 season to the 2016-17 season St. George S.C. would do something that has only been done once before in first division football in Ethiopia and that was winning 4 titles in a row. Notably the 2016-17 season was the first to include 16 clubs, after the Federation decided to expand the league from the previous total of 14 clubs. In turn only two clubs were relegated from the league at the end of the previous season (2015-16) and they were replaced by four promoted clubs from the Higher League in order to form the new 16 club Ethiopian Premier League.

On May 2, 2018, the league was suspended by the Ethiopian Football Federation (EFF) after a referee was attacked during a match between Welwalo Adigrat University and Defense. League play would not resume until two weeks later when assurances were made to the arbiters union that referees would receive insurance coverage in the near future and that previous medical expenses would be covered by the responsible clubs. The 2017-18 Ethiopian Premier League ended in dramatic fashion as debutantes Jimma Aba Jifar F.C. lifted the trophy for the first time in their history on the last day. Jimma Aba Jifar and St. George came into the last day tied on points and goal difference, but a 5–0 victory for Jimma Aba Jifar and a 2-0 result for St. George S.C. meant that the title would go to Jimma thanks to +3 goal difference advantage over St. George S.C. After the 2017-18 season the EFF and premier league clubs agreed to reduce the number of foreign players allowed on each team to three. Rising wages and the neglect of home grown players were given as some of the reasons why the move was made.

On May 5, 2020, the 2019-20 Season was canceled due to the COVID-19 pandemic. As a result, no champion was awarded and no clubs were relegated from the league in this season.

On December 12, 2020, the 2020-21 Season officially kicked off. On May 6, 2021 Fasil Kenema was confirmed to be the 2020-21 premier league champion, the club's first ever first division title.

Competition Format

Competition 
There are 16 clubs in the Premier League. During the course of a season (from November to May) each club plays the others twice (a double round-robin system), once at their home stadium and once at that of their opponents', for a total of 30 games. Teams receive three points for a win and one point for a draw. No points are awarded for a loss. Teams are ranked by total points, then goal difference, and then goals scored. The three lowest placed teams are relegated into the Ethiopian Higher League (second tier of Ethiopian football) and the top three teams from the Higher League are promoted in their place.

Qualification for African competitions 
The winner of the Ethiopian Premier League automatically qualifies for the following year's CAF Champions League. The winner of the Ethiopian Cup qualifies for the preliminary round of the CAF Confederation Cup.

Clubs

2022-23 season 

The following 16 clubs will compete in the Ethiopian Premier League during the 2022–23 season. For a list of winners of the Ethiopian Premier League since its inception, see List of Ethiopian football champions.

2021–22 season 
 Champion: Saint George SC
 Relegated: Sebeta City, Jimma Aba Jifar, Addis Ababa City
 Promoted: Ethio Electric S.C.,Legetafo Legedadi and Ethiopian Insurance F.C.

Television Rights 
In the past matches were rarely if ever broadcast live on television, with those that did airing on the national broadcaster EBC. However, the liberalization of the television market in recent years has allowed for informal transmission of live matches, especially on regional channels such as Amhara TV in the north and Debub TV in the south. Recently the Ethiopian super cup final was televised on ENN TV, a private Ethiopian satellite channel, for the first time. However, these live transmissions have come under much scrutiny from the federation as it claims that neither the clubs nor the broadcasters are informing the proper authority. The federation has threatens to take legal measures against clubs who don't cooperate in the matter.

In June 2017 as part of the Ethiopian Football Federation's digitization process the rights to broadcast the premier league were opened for bidding to five companies including Kana TV, ENN, Walta TV and Chinese Pay television broadcaster, StarTimes. However, the Federation was not satisfied with their income distribution statements in the proposals and negotiations stalled.

In October 2020, SuperSport secured exclusive broadcast rights to the Ethiopian Premier League.

Champions 

In total 18 clubs have won the top division of Ethiopian football, including titles before the inception of the Ethiopian Premier League, namely in the Division one. This list includes clubs from Eritrea (Asmara [includes Hamassien], Embassoria [includes Akale Guzay], Tele SC) which played their football in Ethiopia until the creation of the Eritrean Premier League in 1994.

Previous winners 

1944 : British Military Mission-BMME (Addis Abeba)
1945–47 : no competition
1948 : Key Baher (Addis Abeba)
1949 : Army (Addis Abeba)
1950 : Saint George SC (Addis Abeba)
1951 : Army (Addis Abeba)
1952 : Army (Addis Abeba)
1953 : Army (Addis Abeba)
1954 : Army (Addis Abeba)
1955 : Hamassien (Eritrea)
1956 : Mechal (Addis Abeba)
1957 : Hamassien (Eritrea)
1958 : Akale Guzay (Eritrea)
1959 : Tele SC (Eritrea)
1960 : Cotton FC
1961 : Ethio-Cement (Dire Dawa)
1962 : Cotton FC
1963 : Cotton FC
1964 : Ethio-Cement (Dire Dawa)
1965 : Cotton FC
1966 : Saint George SC (Addis Abeba)
1967 : Saint George SC (Addis Abeba)
1968 : Saint George SC (Addis Abeba)
1969 : Tele SC (Eritrea)
1970 : Tele SC (Eritrea)
1971 : Saint George SC (Addis Abeba)
1972 : Asmara Brewery FC (Eritrea)
1973 : Asmara Brewery FC (Eritrea)
1974 : Embassoria (Eritrea)
1975 : Saint George SC (Addis Abeba)
1976 : Mechal (Addis Abeba)
1977 : Medr Babur (Dire Dawa)
1978 : Ogaden Anbassa (Harar)
1979 : Omedla (Addis Abeba)
1980 : Tegl Fre (Addis Abeba)
1981 : Ermejachen (Addis Abeba)
1982 : Mechal (Addis Abeba)
1983 : Cotton FC
1984 : Mechal (Addis Abeba)
1985 : Brewery (Addis Abeba)
1986 : Brewery (Addis Abeba)
1987 : Saint George SC (Addis Abeba)
1988 : Mechal (Addis Abeba)
1989 : Mechal (Addis Abeba)
1990 : Brewery (Addis Abeba)
1991 : Saint George SC (Addis Abeba)
1992 : Saint George SC (Addis Abeba)
1993 : EEPCO (Addis Abeba)
1994 : Saint George SC (Addis Abeba)
1995 : Saint George SC (Addis Abeba)
1996 : Saint George SC (Addis Abeba)
1997 : Ethiopian Coffee (Addis Abeba)
Ethiopian Premier League
1997–98 : EEPCO (Addis Abeba)
1998–99 : Saint George SC (Addis Abeba)
1999–00 : Saint George SC (Addis Abeba)
2000–01 : EEPCO (Addis Abeba)
2001–02 : Saint George SC (Addis Abeba)
2002–03 : Saint George SC (Addis Abeba)
2003–04 : Awassa City (Awassa)
2004–05 : Saint George SC (Addis Abeba)
2005–06 : Saint George SC (Addis Abeba)
2006–07 : Awassa City (Awassa)*
2007–08 : Saint George SC (Addis Abeba)
2008–09 : Saint George SC (Addis Abeba)
2009–10 : Saint George SC (Addis Abeba)
2010–11 : Ethiopian Coffee (Addis Abeba)
2011–12 : Saint George SC (Addis Abeba)
2012–13 : Dedebit (Addis Abeba)
2013–14 : Saint George SC (Addis Abeba)
2014–15 : Saint George SC (Addis Abeba)
2015–16 : Saint George SC (Addis Abeba)
2016–17 : Saint George SC (Addis Abeba)
2017–18 : Jimma Aba Jifar F.C. (Jimma)
2018–19 : Mekelle 70 Enderta (Mekelle)
2019–20 : Cancelled
2020–21 : Fasil Kenema SC (Gonder)
2021–22 : Saint George SC (Addis Abeba)

*The 2006–07 season was abandoned in June 2007 after 12 clubs (including all 7 clubs from the capital Addis Abeba) boycotted the league season. As a result, the team with the most points among those that remained, Hawassa City, was crowned champion.

Top Goal Scorer

Top Goal Scorer by Season 

*The 2019-20 Season was voided after week 17.

All-Time Top Goal Scorers 

*The 2019-20 Season was voided after week 17.

See also 

 Ethiopian Higher League
 Addis Ababa City Cup
 Ethiopian Cup
 Ethiopian Super Cup
 List of Ethiopian football champions

References

External links
League at fifa.com
ethiofootball.com
RSSSF competition history

 
1944 establishments in Ethiopia
Sports leagues established in 1944
Ethiopia
Football